Rushall railway station was a station serving the villages of Blakenall Heath and Rushall in the Metropolitan Borough of Walsall, England. It was on the South Staffordshire Line between Walsall and Lichfield.

History

It was opened in 1849. It was the first station to fall on the line, closing in 1909. The station was built and served by the South Staffordshire Railway, which later became London, Midland and Scottish Railway (through amalgamation of the London and North Western Railway).

The station was situated on a level crossing in Harden Road, roughly on the border of Walsall and Bloxwich townships. Trains continued to pass through the site more than 70 years after the station's closure, with the line remaining open to goods trains until December 1983. It is preserved in case the railway line between Walsall and Lichfield reopens.

Station site today
All evidence of the former station site and the level crossing including the signal box have been wiped away by the former crossing forming part of Station and Harden Road. The trackbed on both ends are now pedestrian footpaths with the site of the level crossing now part of a road realignment. The southern end of the trackbed from Walsall to Rushall is the end of the footpath with the rest of the trackbed to Ryecroft Junction being heavily overgrown.

References

Disused railway stations in Walsall
Railway stations in Great Britain opened in 1849
Railway stations in Great Britain closed in 1909
1849 establishments in England
Former London and North Western Railway stations